Avazhikkarai is a village in the Tharangambadi Taluk and Mayiladuthurai district of Tamil Nadu, India.

Etymology
Avazhikkarai=Aa(Cow)+vazhi(way)+karai(path) =>way for the cows and woodcutters to reach the Nedum kadu(long forest) named Nedungadu.
Nandalar River flown through this village so karai means hear as sidewall of Nandalar.

Literacy
100% of people known to read and write Tamil Language

Gallery

Nearest Notable Places
 Mayiladuthurai (23 km)
 Tharangambadi (16 km)
 Poompuhar (30 km)
 Karaikkal (16 km)
 Thirunallar (8 km)

External links
 Map from Google Maps
 Electroller Roll pdf Downloadable
 Electroller Roll for Poompuhar constituency 

Villages in Mayiladuthurai district